Emmanuel Ekpo (born 20 December 1987 in Ekori) is a Nigerian professional footballer.

Career

Professional
Ekpo spent his early years in the youth system of Calabar Rovers, before going on to play professionally for Akwa United and Enyimba in the Nigerian Premier League.

Ekpo signed a contract with Columbus Crew on 15 April 2008, and scored an impressive first goal for the Crew on 28 June 2008, in a game against Colorado Rapids. He went on to be an invaluable part of the Crew team which won the 2008 MLS Cup, the 2008 MLS Supporters Shield, and the 2009 Supporters shield repeat, featuring in over 80 games in all competitions in his first three seasons with the club.

In December 2011 Ekpo became a free agent when he did not re-sign with the Crew. In February 2012 he signed with Molde of Norway, managed by Ole Gunnar Solskjaer, on a three-year contract through 2014.

After two and a half seasons with Molde, Ekpo moved to Haugesund in July 2014, leaving Haugesund after the 2014 season when his contract expired.

In October 2016, Ekpo joined Eastern Suburbs AFC in New Zealand.

International
Ekpo participated in African Games qualifying in 2007, took part in CAF Olympic qualifying in 2008, and won a silver medal for participating in the Nigerian national team's games during the 2008 Olympic Games in Beijing. He was a second-half substitute in all six of Nigeria's games.

On 6 September 2011, Ekpo received his first cap with the senior team.  He played 20 minutes in a 3–1 loss to Argentina in a friendly.

Career statistics

Club

Honors

Columbus Crew
 Major League Soccer MLS Cup: 2008
 Major League Soccer Supporter's Shield: 2008, 2009

Molde
 Tippeligaen: 2012
 Norwegian Football Cup: 2013

References

External links
 

1987 births
Living people
Nigerian footballers
Nigerian expatriate footballers
Columbus Crew players
Footballers at the 2008 Summer Olympics
Akwa United F.C. players
Olympic footballers of Nigeria
Calabar Rovers F.C. players
Olympic silver medalists for Nigeria
Enyimba F.C. players
Olympic medalists in football
Expatriate soccer players in the United States
Major League Soccer players
Molde FK players
Eliteserien players
Expatriate footballers in Norway
Medalists at the 2008 Summer Olympics
Association football midfielders